Jean-Pierre du Preez (born 9 November 1994 in Florida, South Africa) is a South African rugby union player for the Glasgow Warriors in the United Rugby Championship. His regular position is lock.

Career

Youth

Despite still being at school, he was also included in the  squad that played in the 2012 Under-19 Provincial Championship a few months later, starting six of their matches as they reached the semi-finals of the competition.

In 2013, Du Preez made the short move to the Johannesburg-based . In addition, he also made two appearances for the  side in the 2013 Under-21 Provincial Championship.

Du Preez was included in the Golden Lions' squad for the 2014 Vodacom Cup, but failed to appear in the competition. He made nine appearances for the  during the round-robin stage of the 2014 Under-21 Provincial Championship, scoring a try in their match against . He scored an early try for the Lions in the match, but it wasn't enough to prevent the Lions falling to a 19–23 defeat and being eliminated from the competition.

Golden Lions / Lions

He made his Super Rugby debut, coming on as a substitute just after the hour mark.

Sale Sharks

It was confirmed in November 2020 that du Preez had signed for Premiership Rugby team Sale Sharks on a two-year contract.

Glasgow Warriors

Du Preez signed for Glasgow Warriors on 2 December 2021 for the 2022-23 season. He made his debut in the pre-season friendly against Ayrshire Bulls. He then made his competitive debut on 23 September 2022 against Cardiff Rugby at Scotstoun Stadium, becoming Glasgow Warrior No. 344 when he came on at lock in the second half. Glasgow put 8 tries past the Welsh side, winning 52-24.

References

1994 births
Living people
People from Roodepoort
South African rugby union players
Rugby union locks
Golden Lions players
Lions (United Rugby Championship) players
Rugby union players from Gauteng
Free State Cheetahs players
Cheetahs (rugby union) players
Sale Sharks players
Glasgow Warriors players